Sarcophagus Pond is a small ice-covered pond 0.15 nautical miles (0.3 km) east-northeast of Dauphin Pond in the Labyrinth of Wright Valley, McMurdo Dry Valleys, Antarctica.

Its descriptive name was suggested by the United States Antarctic Program (USAP) field party that sampled the pond in the 2003–04 season: a rock in the middle of the pond is shaped like a stone coffin.

Lakes of Victoria Land
McMurdo Dry Valleys